The Awaza Congress Center is located in the Awaza Borough of the city of Türkmenbaşy, Turkmenistan.  It is one of the largest conference centres in the world. It is used for conventions, exhibitions and concerts. It opened in September 2015.

Overview

Built by Turkish construction firm Polimeks, work on the project began in November 2012 and ended in September 2015. The center was opened by President of Turkmenistan Gurbanguly Berdimuhamedow on 8 September 2015.

Halls

The Awaza Congress Center consists of two conference halls with 2000 and 476 seats, one banquet hall with a capacity of 450 and 256 persons depending on seating or buffet arrangement, and a press conference hall with a capacity of 128 persons. The Congress Center also houses a 130-capacity multipurpose meeting room for heads of states, a hall for signing bilateral protocols, and a meeting hall for government delegations.

Events 
On September 10, 2015, a meeting of the People's Council of Turkmenistan was held in the Convention Center.

References

External links
 Awaza Congress Center by Polimeks

Convention centers in Turkmenistan
Concert halls in Turkmenistan
High-tech architecture
Event venues established in 2015
2015 establishments in Turkmenistan